Shelbyville is a city in Addison Township, Shelby County, in the U.S. state of Indiana and is the county seat. The population was 20,067 as of the 2020 census.

History 

In 1818, the land that would become Shelbyville was ceded to the United States by the Miami tribe in the Treaty of St. Mary's. Also in 1818, the backwoodsman Jacob Whetzel and a party cut a trail through this "New Purchase" from the Whitewater River at Laurel due west to the White River at Waverly. This trail became known as Whetzel's Trace and was the first east–west road into the New Purchase of central Indiana. Whetzel's Trace was cut just 4 miles north of site of Shelbyville and proved important in the settlement of Shelby County.

Shelbyville was platted in 1822. Shelbyville was named in honor of Isaac Shelby, the first and fifth Governor of Kentucky and soldier in Lord Dunmore's War, the Revolutionary War, and the War of 1812. The town incorporated January 21, 1850.

The Shelbyville post office has been in operation since 1823.

The city charter received at that time was destroyed in the City Hall fire on January 1, 1928.

A railroad was built connecting Shelbyville to Indianapolis in the late 1830s, the first railroad in the state, that later expanded to connect to Madison and Jeffersonville.

Allegheny Airlines Flight 853 crashed on September 9, 1969 near Fairland. Nearly thirty of the 83 people killed were never identified and were buried in a mass grave in Shelbyville.

John Hamilton House, Lora B. Pearson School, Porter Pool Bathhouse, Shelbyville Commercial Historic District, Shelby County Courthouse, Shelbyville High School, and West Side Historic District are listed on the National Register of Historic Places. The Grover Museum features a "Streets of Old Shelby" exhibit.

Horseshoe Indianapolis (owned by Caesars Entertainment) opened in 2009.

Geography 
Shelbyville is located in Central Indiana and within the Indianapolis metropolitan area. The city is at the fork of the Little Blue and Big Blue Rivers.

Climate 
Shelbyville has a humid continental climate (Köppen climate classification Dfa) experiencing four distinct seasons.

Education 
Shelbyville Central Schools consists of Shelbyville Senior High School, Shelbyville Middle School, Coulston Elementary, Loper Elementary, and Hendricks Elementary. The high school and middle school's mascot is Golden Bears. Coulston is the Comets, Hendricks is the Hurricanes and Loper is the Bulldogs.

St. Joseph Elementary School is a private school, associated with St. Joseph Catholic Church, in Shelbyville.

Prior to 1870, no public education was provided for Shelbyville's black residents.  In 1870, the state required communities to provide education, but allowed them to choose whether they would be integrated or segregated.  Shelbyville schools were integrated at the high school level, but segregated in the elementary grades until 1949.

Shelbyville has a public library, a branch of the Shelby County Public Library.

Demographics

2010 census 
As of the census of 2010, there were 19,191 people, 7,682 households, and 4,848 families living in the city. The racial makeup of the city was 91.9% White, 1.9% African American, 0.2% Native American, 1.0% Asian, 3.2% from other races, and 1.7% from two or more races. Hispanic or Latino of any race were 7.1% of the population.

There were 7,682 households, of which 34.3% had children under the age of 18 living with them, 42.6% were married couples living together, 13.6% had a female householder with no husband present, 6.9% had a male householder with no wife present, and 36.9% were non-families. 30.7% of all households were made up of individuals, and 12.1% had someone living alone who was 65 years of age or older. The average household size was 2.43 and the average family size was 3.00.

The median age in the city was 35.9 years. 25.5% of residents were under the age of 18; 9.4% were between the ages of 18 and 24; 27.2% were from 25 to 44; 24.8% were from 45 to 64; and 13% were 65 years of age or older. The gender makeup of the city was 48.8% male and 51.2% female.

2000 census 
As of the census of 2000, there were 17,951 people, 7,307 households, and 4,654 families living in the city. The racial makeup of the city was 95.28% White, 1.58% African American, 0.15% Native American, 1.16% Asian, 0.02% Pacific Islander, 0.90% from other races, and 0.91% from two or more races. Hispanic or Latino of any race were 1.91% of the population.

There were 7,307 households, out of which 32.3% had children under the age of 18 living with them, 46.3% were married couples living together, 12.5% had a female householder with no husband present, and 36.3% were non-families. 30.3% of all households were made up of individuals, and 12.2% had someone living alone who was 65 years of age or older. The average household size was 2.39 and the average family size was 2.96.
In the city, the population was spread out, with 26.2% under the age of 18, 9.5% from 18 to 24, 31.6% from 25 to 44, 19.3% from 45 to 64, and 13.3% who were 65 years of age or older. The median age was 34 years. For every 100 females, there were 94.8 males. For every 100 females age 18 and over, there were 92.4 males.

The median income for a household in the city was $36,824, and the median income for a family was $46,379. Males had a median income of $34,550 versus $24,331 for females. The per capita income for the city was $18,670. About 6.1% of families and 9.1% of the population were below the poverty line, including 10.8% of those under age 18 and 11.6% of those age 65 or over.

Notable people 

Sandy Allen (1955–2008), world's tallest living female
James "Bucky" Barnes, fictional character from Marvel Comics universe and former Captain America, was born in Shelbyville.
Ovid Butler (1801-1881), abolitionist and chancellor and namesake of Butler University, practiced law in Shelbyville from 1825 to 1836.
William Garrett, Indiana Mr. Basketball, first African-American basketball player in Big Ten Conference for Indiana University, played for Boston Celtics and Harlem Globetrotters. Led Shelbyville HS basketball team to its only state high school basketball championship in 1947.
Ken Gunning, basketball player for Indiana Hoosiers and head coach at Wichita State University
Thomas Hendricks, 21st Vice President of the United States under Grover Cleveland in 1885
Victor Higgins (1884–1949), painter
John W. Hill (1890–1977), founder of PR firm Hill & Knowlton in Cleveland in 1927
Marjorie Main (1890-1975), Ma Kettle in 10 Ma and Pa Kettle movies
Charles Major (1856–1913), novelist
Edna Parker (1893-2008), oldest living person at the time of her death at age 115
Mike Phipps, NFL quarterback for NFL's Cleveland Browns and Chicago Bears. Phipps finished second in the voting for the Heisman Trophy in 1969.
James Pierce, silent film actor
Kid Quill (born in 1994), recording artist
Mike Sexton, professional poker player and commentator. Inducted into the Poker Hall of Fame in 2009.
Waldo E. Sexton, entrepreneur
Wilbur Shaw, three-time Indianapolis 500 winner in 1937, 1939, and 1940
W. Roland Stine, educator and politician
Bob Zimny, NFL football player for the Chicago Cardinals. Won the 1947 NFL Championship.

References

External links 
 City of Shelbyville, Indiana website

Cities in Indiana
Cities in Shelby County, Indiana
County seats in Indiana
Indianapolis metropolitan area